Guajillo may refer to:
Guajillo Acacia, a common name for Acacia berlandieri, a shrub native to the Southwestern United States
The Guajillo chili, a variety of chili pepper